William Middleton Griggs,  is a retired Australian physician specialising in trauma.

In 2006 Griggs became a Member of the Order of Australia for "service to medicine, particularly through trauma, emergency and care management and education, and critical care and retrieval and in support of the Australian Defence Force." 

Griggs is one of the founding members of the Australasian Trauma Society and was president from 2001 to 2003. Griggs is the author of more than 75 publications and was described by Governor Hieu Van Le as "The face of trauma care and retrieval medicine in South Australia".

Griggs is currently the non-executive director of Super SA (since 2009), Return to Work SA (since 2013) and Funds SA (since 2018).

Medical career
Griggs began his medical career in 1976 as a volunteer paramedic while studying as a medical student. He attended his hundredth fatal road crash prior to his graduation in 1981.

As a major trauma specialist, Griggs frequently was called upon by the Australian Defence Force to aid in disaster relief, often assisting in  Aeromedical evacuation. This included the 2002 Bali bombings, 2004 Boxing Day tsunami, Garuda Indonesia Flight 200, the SIEV 36 Explosion and the 2009 Samoan Tsunami.

Griggs is considered a world authority on trauma and disaster medicine.

In 1989 Griggs invented a procedure known as the "Griggs technique", which assists in aiding breathing issues by "performing a percutaneous tracheotomy and making an artificial airway for the critically ill and injured". "Griggs technique" has since become more prevalent in the field of trauma medicine and was performed on Pope John Paul II when he experienced breathing issues in 2005.

Griggs held the position of director of trauma services from 1995 as well as Senior consultant for intensive care, retrieval services and anaesthetics from 1989 until his retirement in 2018 at the Royal Adelaide Hospital.

Griggs also acted as director for retrieval coordination for MedSTAR. and was the South Australian State Controller (Health and Medical) for the DPC from 2007 to 2017. He also worked for the South Australian Ambulance Service from the early 1980s until 2019, and has been a volunteer with St John Ambulance Australia since the mid-1970s. He became Commissioner (the most senior volunteer) of St John Ambulance Australia SA in 2021 and still attends major sporting and social events as a senior volunteer Doctor.

From 2010 Griggs was a non-executive director of the Motor Accident Commission of South Australia. He was appointed as the chair of MAC from 2015 and continued in this role until 2019.

International aid
Griggs attained the rank of group captain in the Royal Australian Air Force and was honoured by the United States with a Navy Unit Commendation. Griggs was involved in the Gulf War during Operation Desert Shield and Operation Desert Storm attached to the United States Navy hospital ship Comfort and the US Navy aircraft carrier Ranger.

In 1994 Griggs deployed to Bougainville as one of five members to provide surgical support as part of the South Pacific Peacekeeping Force during talks in Arawa. Griggs provided medical support from the Buka airfield and later aboard . Upon arrival in Bougainville there had been no doctors on the island for numerous years, with some residents not receiving medical care in over ten years. He returned twice in 1998 as part of a truce and peace monitoring group. In 2004 he was deployed into Banda Aceh, Indonesia, as part of the military response following the 2004 Indian Ocean earthquake and tsunami. Within Indonesia he operated as one of a four person aeromedical evacuation team along with other military personnel with significant trauma response experience. While in Banda Aceh he was photographed with then U.S. Secretary of State Colin Powell while assisting an injured local.

Griggs played an active role in the Australian medical response to the 2002 Bali bombings, helping to coordinate the evacuation of those injured in the attack through Darwin to the Major Trauma and Burns Units all around Australia. He was called upon by the Australian government to fulfil a similar role later during the 2005 Bali Bombings. Later in 2005 Griggs was awarded a Chief of Defence Force Commendation for "Outstanding Service during Operation Sumatra Assist".

Griggs joined the South Australian Australian Disaster Medical Assistance Team (AUSMAT), which deployed to Samoa following the October 2009 Samoa earthquake and tsunami along with other Australian Aid staff, DFAT personnel and interstate medical professionals., later that year he also assisted in the medical evacuations from the SIEV 36 disaster off Ashmore Reef.    

Griggs also managed the evacuation of victims from the crash of the Garuda Airlines Flight GA200 in Yogyakarta in 2007.

Personal life
Griggs retired from medicine in 2018, at which time he revealed he had suffered from Post-traumatic stress disorder. 

Griggs has an interest in road accident prevention. In 2004 he started the 'Roads 2 Survival' Program, a community-based initiative which encourages youth to become safer road users.

In 2010, Griggs was chosen to appear on the cover of the 2010/2011 Adelaide White Pages under the theme "Courageous Australians" as a result of a rescue in 1994 where he saved the life of Officer David McManus who had been shot 14 times during a siege in the Barossa.

Education
Griggs attended Prince Alfred College where he was captain of the chess club. He then obtained his MBBS from the University of Adelaide in 1981 and the FFARACS (anaesthesia – 1986 and intensive care – 1989) followed by the FANZCA in 1992, FFICANZCA in 1993.

In the 2000s Griggs returned to the University of Adelaide, where he completed an MBA, graduating on the dean's list of top MBA graduates. He obtained his postgraduate diploma in aviation medicine from the University of Otago in 2000. He qualified for his MBA from the University of Adelaide in December 2009.

Griggs was made a clinical associate professor at the University of Adelaide at the end of 2006. He is a clinical associate professor at Adelaide University and has previously been a senior lecturer at Griffith University and the University of Otago.

References

External links
 Funds SA Annual Reports https://www.funds.sa.gov.au/publications/annual-reports
 University of Adelaide https://web.archive.org/web/20070705035718/http://www.health.adelaide.edu.au/icu/rah/ss_griggs.htm
 Royal Adelaide Hospital Trauma Service https://web.archive.org/web/20080723051311/http://www.rah.sa.gov.au/trauma/staff_griggs.php
 Roads 2 Survival http://www.roads2survival.com.au/index.htm
 Copyright photos: 1999, 2006,  2007, 2008, 2009, 2009

Year of birth missing (living people)
Living people
Australian military personnel of the International Force for East Timor
Scientists from Adelaide
People educated at Prince Alfred College
University of Adelaide Medical School alumni
Academic staff of the University of Adelaide
Academic staff of the University of Otago
Members of the Order of Australia
Australian of the Year Award winners